The Young Liberals of Canada (YLC) (French: Jeunes libéraux du Canada) is the national youth wing of the Liberal Party of Canada. All members of the Liberal Party aged 25 and under are automatically members of the YLC. The Young Liberals of Canada are an official commission of the Liberal Party and the largest youth political organization in Canada.

The YLC is composed of Provincial and Territorial Boards (PTBs) in all ten provinces and clubs on almost 50 post-secondary campuses and in most of Canada's 338 ridings. The organization is led by the National Executive, the current national chair is Lucas Borchenko. The YLC plays a key role in both mobilizing young people to help elect Liberal MPs during elections, and developing and promoting progressive policies between them. Several major initiatives by Liberal governments over the years have started out as Young Liberal ideas, including same-sex marriage, marijuana legalization and medical assistance in dying.

Many Young Liberal alumni have gone on to have prominent careers in Canadian politics, including former prime ministers Jean Chrétien and Paul Martin and current cabinet ministers Bardish Chagger and Karina Gould, among others.

History

1936–1984

The Young Liberals of Canada were founded in 1936, though youth had played a role in the Liberal Party (particularly election campaigns) since its founding. During the 1950s and 60s, future Prime Ministers Jean Chrétien and Paul Martin were both active Young Liberals. Chrétien, who joined during law school at Université Laval, was elected president of the uLaval Young Liberals in 1958 (no one else wanted the job, as everyone else was too afraid of drawing the ire of the Union Nationale.)  Martin was active during his years at the University of Toronto, where future Liberal leaders Michael Ignatieff and Bob Rae were also engaged in Young Liberal activities on campus.

In an attempt to attract Young Liberal supporters for his 1968 leadership bid, Pierre Trudeau campaigned on the promise  of reserving specific number of delegate spots at national conventions to Young Liberals. Trudeau went on to win the party leadership, and YLC was allocated guaranteed number of delegate spots in each riding association and in accredited campus Liberal clubs. This has meant the YLC has wielded unique influence in the party's leadership selection as it controls the accreditation process of campus clubs, which were fierce battlegrounds during federal leadership races from the early 1980s to 2006. Trudeau's government also lowered the voting age to 18 in 1970, further endearing him to Young Liberals.

1984–2006

During the 1980s, YLC members found themselves on both sides of raging intra-party debates. During the 1986 leadership review, some supported leader John Turner, such as future MP Joe Peschisolido, while others opposed him, including YLC-Quebec President and future politician Denis Coderre (who publicly called for Turner's resignation.) During the 1990 leadership race, the Paul Martin leadership campaign was particularly notorious for hostile take over of campus clubs, though many Young Liberals supported the eventual winner (and YLC alumni), Jean Chrétien.

Under the leadership of president (and future MP) Greg Fergus, the YLC began to push for the legalization of same-sex marriage in 1994, the first group in the Liberal Party to do so. The 2003 leadership race, which saw YLC alum Paul Martin become prime minister, again featured heavy Young Liberal involvement, with intense battles for delegates on many campuses (especially by the Martin campaign.) Young Liberals mobilized against Canada's proposed entry into United States Missile Defence System in 2005, helping convince the Martin Government to say no to the Americans.

2006–Present

The YLC's influence in the leadership selection process was greatly diminished in 2009 when the federal party changed its constitution to elect its future leaders by a "weighted One Member, One Vote" voting method. Following this, and the Liberal Party's historic defeat in 2011, the YLC helped lead the process of party renewal by assisting youth in taking on new leadership roles and promoting new progressive policies. Most prominently, Young Liberal policies advocating for the legalization of marijuana (first passed by the YLC-British Columbia) and medical assistance in dying (passed by the Ontario Young Liberals) were overwhelmingly endorsed by the party's entire membership at the 2012 and 2014 Biennial conventions and were key planks in the 2015 election platform.

The election of the youthful and energetic Justin Trudeau as Liberal leader in 2013 helped attract new Young Liberals. The younger Trudeau has proven as popular with Canadian youth as his father, helping the YLC recruit new members and ensuring youth concerns were included in the Liberals 2015 election platform. This popularity, coupled with the YLC's efforts, helped ensure a record youth turnout in the 2015 election, which made the difference in securing a majority government. Following the Liberals' victory, Trudeau appointed himself as his government's Minister of Youth, a move that met with approval from many Young Liberals. As part of larger reforms to the Liberal Party's internal structures beginning in 2016, the YLC's Constitution was replaced by a new Charter.

YLC has also sometimes been a source of embarrassments and scandals for the party.  
In 1997, Jim MacLaren, president of the BC wing, misappropriated $30,000 from the federal party's coffers, and was later convicted of fraud.
In 1999, several drunken Young Liberal delegates attending a convention in Victoria smashed up a couple of hotel rooms.  The Liberal Party was sued by the hotel and settled out of court for an undisclosed amount.
In 2000, Jesse Davidson, president of the Ontario wing, faced one count of fraud over $5,000 and 23 counts for allegedly drewing money from the party's bank account by forging the signature of a former treasurer.  The charges were dropped in 2011 in exchange of Davidson agreeing to repay some $7,000 that he withdrew from the party's bank account. 
In 2007, a former president of the BC wing, Erik Bornmann, was implicated by the investigation following the BC Legislature Raids, and served as a key witness in a trial that pertains to the scandal.
In 2015, YLC-BC President Linda Ching was discovered to be the daughter of Cheng Muyang, a fugitive wanted by Chinese authorities for graft. Cheng is believed to have helped his daughter secure the position of president. After Cheng's fugitive status became publicly known, Linda Ching quietly called an election, but did not resign.

Policy

Developing and promoting progressive policies is at the core of the YLC's mission. The YLC brings a slate of policies to every Liberal Biennial Convention, which are solicited, debated and voted on every two years in the lead-up to the convention. In many policy areas, Young Liberals have been more progressive than the party as a whole, taking a pro-same sex marriage position as early as 1994. During the Liberal governments of Jean Chrétien and Paul Martin (1993-2006), the YLC successfully pushed initiatives like the long-term commitment to Africa, the Canada Post-Secondary Education Transfer, the promotion and protection of safe-injection sites and the commitment to the Kyoto Accord. The 2005 decision of the Martin Liberal government to not enter into the American missile defence program was in part credited to the opposition of the Young Liberals.

During the Harper years (2006-2015), the YLC redoubled its focus on advocacy and highlighted the government's neglect of youth issues. In response to Conservative TV and radio attack ads, the YLC launched the "Hi.im.a.liberal.ca" initiative, a spoof of the Mac/PC ads, which garnered media attention for its novelty. In May 2010, they began a campaign in opposition to Bill C-391 and in support of the federal long gun registry. Other initiatives during this period included the "Red Revolution" campaign (focusing on "taking Canada back" by improving youth involvement in politics), the "Go Green, Vote Red" initiative (to appeal to environmentally-minded voters and promote the party's "Green Shift" program) and the "End the Crisis" campaign (to increase the admission of Middle Eastern refugees displaced by the Syrian Civil War).

In the lead-up to the 2015 election, the YLC adopted two landmark policies, supporting the legalization of marijuana (2011) and medical assistance in dying (2013). Young Liberals mobilized and successfully persuaded the party as a whole do endorse these at the 2012 and 2014 Biennial Conventions. These were embraced by new leader Justin Trudeau; both were included in the Liberals' 2015 election platform and are now being implemented by the Trudeau government.

Campus and Riding Clubs
The Young Liberals of Canada have almost 50 active campus Young Liberal clubs at post-secondary institutions in every province, as well as riding Young Liberal clubs in most of Canada's 338 ridings. These clubs are established by Provincial and Territorial Boards and accredited by the National Executive of the YLC. Much like the YLC and PTBs, these have an executive structure led by a president. Each club may send delegates, with voting rights, to provincial, territorial, and/or national conventions and conferences for both the YLC and the Liberal Party of Canada. Riding clubs are often geared towards high schools students and work closely with local riding associations, MPs and candidates. Campus clubs (which are often larger and more active) organize many activities throughout the year, including bringing politicians and other speakers to campus, facilitating policy discussions and debates and assisting local MPs at election time. Many of the YLC's best-known alumni and most prominent policies started with campus clubs.

Relationship to the party

The Young Liberals of Canada have a dual mission - representing the interests and values of youth within the Liberal Party and promoting the party's ideas and policies to Young Canadians. With a membership encompassing all registered Liberals who have not yet celebrated their 26th birthday, it is not a separate entity from the Liberal Party but is rather an official Party Commission.  The YLC mirrors the structure of the Liberal Party of Canada. The organization is led by a National Executive that runs the affairs of the entire YLC, with Provincial and Territorial Boards (PTBs) overseeing local activities and clubs in each province and territory. The YLC does not always agree with the Liberal Party. In fact, the YLC often pushes the larger membership of the party to adopt new policies that may be viewed as too radical or challenging; such as same-sex marriage, marijuana legalization and death with dignity. The YLC and Liberal Party of Canada often do not agree, or have not passed the same resolutions, at any given time. Young Liberals also play a key role during elections, often contributing the bulk of campaign volunteers. Many current and former top Liberal strategists and organizers began their careers in the Young Liberals.

Prominent former members
YLC has proven to be a training ground for budding politicians and political organizers.  Many elected officials played prominent roles at the party's youth wing, including several former prime ministers, nearly a dozen sitting MPs and many federal and provincial cabinet ministers. They include:

Current and former party leaders

 Jean Chrétien, 21st Prime Minister of Canada (President of the Université Laval Young Liberals)
 Christy Clark, former leader of the British Columbia Liberal Party and Premier of British Columbia (national director and president of Simon Fraser University Young Liberals)
Steven Del Duca, leader of the Ontario Liberal Party (President of the University of Toronto Liberals)
Stephen Harper, 23rd Prime Minister of Canada (a Young Liberal before joining the Conservatives
 Michael Ignatieff, Liberal leader (2008–2011) (National Youth Organizer)
 Jason Kenney, leader of the United Conservative Party, Premier of Alberta (2019–2022)
Paul Martin, 22nd Prime Minister of Canada
Bob Rae, former interim Liberal leader (2011–2013)

Federal politicians

Scott Andrews, former MP for Avalon (YLC vice president; contested YLC's presidency)
Mauril Bélanger, former MP for Ottawa-Vanier and Minister of Internal Trade
Bardish Chagger, MP for Waterloo and Government House Leader (President of the University of Waterloo Young Liberals)
Arnold Chan, former MP for Scarborough-Agincourt
Pam Damoff, MP for Oakville North-Burlington
Matt DeCourcey, former MP for Fredericton
Ruby Dhalla, former MP for Brampton-Springdale (member of the YLC's national executive)
Francis Drouin, MP for Glengarry-Prescott-Russell
 Ali Ehsassi, MP for Willowdale (President of the University of Toronto Liberals)
Greg Fergus, MP for Hull-Aylmer (YLC President)
Ralph Goodale, former MP for Regina-Wascana and cabinet minister (President of the Saskatchewan Young Liberals)
Karina Gould, MP for Burlington and Minister of Democratic Institutions
 Mark Holland, MP for Ajax
Jean Lapierre, former MP for Shefford and Outremont and Minister of Transport
Steven MacKinnon, MP for Gatineau
Bryan May, MP for Cambridge
Rob Oliphant, MP for Don Valley West (President of the University of Toronto Liberals executive and member of YLC's Ontario wing in the 1970s)
 Joe Peschisolido, former MP for Steveston-Richmond East (President of the University of Toronto Liberals and member of the YLC's National Executive in the 1980s)
Marcel Prud'homme, long-time Liberal MP (1964–1993) and independent senator (1993–2009) (elected YLC president in 1958)
 Gagan Sikand, former MP for Mississauga-Streetsville
Anita Vandenbeld, MP for Ottawa West-Nepean
 Borys Wrzesnewskyj, former MP for Etobicoke Centre

Provincial and municipal politicians

 Patricia Arab, MLA for Fairview-Clayton Park and Minister or Communications and Internal Services
Yvan Baker, former Ontario MPP for Etobicoke Centre
Mitchell Brownstein, Mayor of Côte St. Luc, Quebec
Denis Coderre, former mayor of Montreal, MP for Bourassa and federal minister (as president of YLC's Quebec wing called for the resignation of Leader John Turner)
Michael Coteau, Ontario MPP for Don Valley East and Minister of Child and Youth Services (President of the Carleton Liberals)
Bonnie Crombie, Mayor of Mississauga and former MP for Mississauga-Streetsville (Student Director of YLC's Ontario wing)
Dwight Duncan, former Ontario Finance Minister (worked as aide to Herb Gray, contested the presidency of YLC's Ontario wing)
Cindy Lamoureux, Manitoba MLA for Burrows
Todd Stone, British Columbia MLA for Kamloops-South Thompson and former Minister of Transportation and Infrastructure

National Executive

The National Executive of YLC consists of the following table officers and the president of YLC various provincial/territorial wings.
 Lucas Borchenko (National Chair)
 Sara Mirwaldt (National Vice-chair (English))
 Laurent Ruffo-Caracchini (National Vice-chair (French))
 Nicholas Ellis (National Organization Chair)
 Raj Gill (National Policy Chair)
 Vacant (National Communications Chair)
 Wei Shu Wang (National Finance Chair)
 Gary Xie (National Membership Chair)
 Jordan Derochie (Indigenous Youth Rep (IPC & YLC))
 Molly Wilkins (Women's Representative of the Young Liberals (NWLC & YLC))

Past Presidents:
 Haseeb Hassan (2020-2021)
 David Hickey (2018-2020)
 Mira Ahmad (2016-2018) 
 Justin Kaiser (2014-2016)
 Samuel Lavoie (2009–14)
 Cory Pike (2006–09)
 Richard Diamond (2005–06)
 Ann Takagi (2003–05)
 Veronique de Pasillé (1998-2003)
 Bruno Roy (1996–98)
 Greg Fergus (1994–96)
 Michel Chartrand (1992–94)
 Charles Boyer (1990–92)

Past National Directors:
 Alyx Holland
 Keith Torrie
 Adam Miron
 Scott Pickup
 Melanie Cameron
 Denise Brundson
 Adam Brown
 Tyler Banham
 Jamie Innes
 Mark Watton
 Fred Gaspar
 Christy Clark

International
The organization is a member of the International Federation of Liberal Youth, and at one time sent delegates to international gatherings of youth from Liberal parties around the world.

References

External links
 Official Web site of the Young Liberals of Canada
 Official Web site of the Ontario Young Liberals
 Official Web site of the Nova Scotia Young Liberals

Liberal Party of Canada
Liberal
Youth wings of liberal parties